King's Highway 129, commonly referred to as Highway 129, is a provincially maintained highway in the Canadian province of Ontario. The route is isolated and lightly travelled throughout its length; while providing access to several remote settlements, the only sizable communities along the route are the two termini. The highway was established in 1956 along the Chapleau Road. From the early 1960s to mid-1970s, Highway 129 was designated as the Chapleau Route of the Trans-Canada Highway.

Route description 

Highway 129 is one of the most isolated in Ontario and among the least used of the King's Highways. Although the highway is an important access route for several isolated communities, including Little Rapids, Sultan, Kormak and Nemegos, as well as provincial parks such as Aubrey Falls, Five Mile Lake and Wakami Lake,
the only community located directly on the highway's route between its termini is Wharncliffe.
There are very few services along Highway 129. Tunnel Lake Trading Post and Aubrey Falls Trading Post & Resort offer some basic goods, fuel and lodging for travellers and local residents (albeit with limited hours).

The route begins in the town of Thessalon at Highway 17, north of Lake Huron.
It travels northeast through the Municipality of Huron Shores, passing the Thessalon Township Heritage Museum southeast of Little Rapids.
Wedging between Basswood Lake and the Byrnes Lake White Birch Provincial Conservation Reserve, it enters the unorganized portions of Algoma District. It passes through Wharncliffe, crosses the Mississagi River and encounters Highway 554, which travels east to Kynoch.

North of Highway 554, the route is generally parallel to the river and Mississagi River Provincial Park. After passing west of Wakomata Lake on its journey through completely undeveloped forest and muskeg, it reaches a junction with Highway 556 southwest of Aubrey Falls Provincial Park. Thereafter, the highway roughly follows the Wenebegon River through Wenebegon River Provincial Park to Wenebegon Lake. Highway 129 encounters the entrance to Five Mile Provincial Park and meets Highway 667, which travels east through Sultan, becoming the Sultan Industrial Road and connecting with Highway 144.

From this junction, the route travels northwest towards Highway 101, where drivers must turn right to continue north on the route.
Highway 129 continues north alongside the Sudbury–White River CPR line. It ends at the southern town limits of Chapleau, continuing north as a local road through the town and into the Chapleau Crown Game Preserve, the largest game preserve in the world.

History 
Highway 129 was first designated between Aubrey Falls and Chapleau in 1956, following the Thessalon–Chapleau Highway, a dirt road along the banks of the Mississagi River that opened to traffic on January 28, 1949.
Though opened, this initial road was almost impassable, and certainly dangerous. Despite this, it quickly gained notoriety for its breathtaking scenery and seemingly limitless hunting and fishing potential.
However, the poor condition of the road often left a terrible impression on tourists. John Austin Moore described his voyage up the road during the summer of 1951:
"Our first trip by car took us over the famed Chapleau Road, the scenery and unique loneliness of which have been often reported in magazines. And surely its condition not long after it had opened to travel, when we first drove it in June 1951, was unforgettable. One trip over its 145 miles was almost guaranteed to shorten your life"

The route was extended south on February 27, 1957, absorbing the entire length of Highway 559, itself designated in 1956. The Highway 559 designation has since been reused in Parry Sound District.
In 1961, the partially gravel surfaced highway was designated as the Chapleau Route of the Trans-Canada Highway, despite being only a spur in the network at that time.
This designation lasted until as early as 1974 and as late as 1978.

Highway 129 was the last King's Highway to be paved; the section immediately south of Aubrey Falls remained a gravel road as late as 1982.
The one-lane Rapid River Bridge was replaced by an adjacent two-lane bridge in the second quarter of 2010.

Major intersections

References 

129
Former segments of the Trans-Canada Highway